One Morning Near Troodos (1956) was a British TV play by Iain MacCormick which aired on the BBC as part of Sunday Night Theatre. It was the first British TV play about the Cyprus Emergency.

Plot
A journalist in Cyprus is captured by EOKA guerillas. British troops track down the guerrillas and the journalist leads them into a rebel ambush. A woman is attracted to a British soldier.

1959 Australian Version

Iain MacCormick was Australian and a number of his plays, originally written for British TV, were adapted for Australian television. The play was performed live on Australian TV in 1959.

It was the ABC's 22nd live drama made in Melbourne.

Premise
In Cyprus there has been terrorist activity near Mt Troodos, leading to a large scale operation of British troops and police. Two British journalists arrive in the area: James   Stark,   is   an   unscrupulous and influential former MP, and Walters, his hard-drinking offsider. Walters does the work while Start takes the credit. They are not allowed into the fighting zone so make their headquarters in a nearby village. Start decides to deal with the terrorists himself, thereby bringing bloodshed to the village.

Cast
Edward Brayshaw		
Syd Conabere		
Carol Armstrong as Lena, the Greek girl attracted to a British soldier		
Lloyd Cunnington		
Frank Gatliff		
Judith Godden		
Ken Goodlet		
Edward Howell		
Robert Peach
Jennifer Clare

Production
The play had been performed on Melbourne radio in 1957 and repeated in 1959.

It was rehearsed and filmed at ABC's studios at Rippon Lea. There was some location filming on Melbourne streets. It had a cast of fifteen.

A segment of the script was published in The Age as an example of TV scripts. The article said that Australian writers were typically paid between £60-£80 a script.

Alexandra Atanassious was the Greek text adviser.

See also
List of live television plays broadcast on Australian Broadcasting Corporation (1950s)

References

External links
1956 British TV play at IMDb
1959 Australian TV play at IMDb
One Morning Near Troodos at AustLit

Films set in Cyprus
1956 television plays
British television plays
Cyprus Emergency
Films directed by William Sterling (director)